Thobani Centre is a commercial building in Kampala, the capital and largest city of Uganda.

Location
The skyscraper is located on Kampala Road, the main business street in Kampala, Uganda's capital city, to the immediate west of the headquarters of KCB Bank Uganda Limited, and across the street from Orient Plaza, the headquarters of Orient Bank. The geographical coordinates of the building are:0°18'46.0"N, 32°35'09.0"E (Latitude:0.312778; Longitude:32.585833).

Overview
Thobani Centre is owned by its developers, an entity known as Thobani Ventures Limited, owned by Kanani Group of India, Jubilee Stores of Dubai and Fourways Investments Limited of Uganda. Mohamood Thobani, managing director of Fourways Investments, also doubles as the vice chairman of Diamond Trust Bank Uganda Limited.

Tenants
Thobani Centre is a mixed use development that caters to corporate offices, restaurants and retail outlets.

See also
 Mapeera House
 Janani Luwum Church House
 DFCU House
 Tall Kampala Buildings
 Central Kampala

References

External links
  Uganda’s Mohamood Thobani Supports Local Social Causes As of 12 February 2010.

Buildings and structures in Kampala
Kampala Central Division
Commercial buildings completed in 2018
Skyscraper office buildings in Uganda
2018 establishments in Uganda